Atrichodendron is a genus of flowering plants belonging to the family Solanaceae.

Its native range is Vietnam.

Species:

Atrichodendron tonkinense

References

Solanaceae
Solanaceae genera